Peter, Paul and Mary (EP) was an EP 45 rpm record by the American folk trio Peter, Paul and Mary, released on Warner Brothers and Decca Records in the UK in 1963, WEP 6114, in mono.  The record reached #3 in the British EP charts.

Songs
Side 1
 Blowing in the Wind (Dylan)
 Lemon Tree (Holt)

Side 2
 If I Had a Hammer, (Pete Seeger, Hays)
 Where Have All the Flowers Gone? (Seeger)

Personnel
 Peter Yarrow, guitar, vocals 
 Paul Stookey, guitar, vocals
 Mary Travers, vocals
 unidentified bass player

References

1963 EPs
Peter, Paul and Mary albums